Shadows Over Bögenhafen is a 1987 role-playing game adventure for Warhammer Fantasy Roleplay published by Games Workshop.

Contents
Shadows Over Bögenhafen follows the first adventure, The Enemy Within as the player characters go to the fair at Bogenhafen.

Reception
Richard A. Edwards reviewed Shadows Over Bögenhafen in Space Gamer/Fantasy Gamer No. 82. Edwards commented that "Those Game Masters who want a well done town for use in their own campaign could certainly use the information provided for Bogenhafen."

Reviews
Dragon #126 (Oct., 1987)
White Wolf #9 (1988)
 Casus Belli #37 (April 1987)

References

Role-playing game supplements introduced in 1987
Warhammer Fantasy Roleplay adventures